Daniela Hantuchová was the defending champion, but lost in the third round to Kimiko Date-Krumm.

Ana Ivanovic won the title, defeating Barbora Záhlavová-Strýcová in the final, 6–3, 6–2. This was the only title Ivanovic won on grass throughout her career.

Seeds
The top eight seeds receive a bye into the second round.

Draw

Finals

Top half

Section 1

Section 2

Bottom half

Section 3

Section 4

Qualifying

Seeds

Qualifiers

Lucky losers
  Tímea Babos

Qualifying draw

First qualifier

Second qualifier

Third qualifier

Fourth qualifier

Fifth qualifier

Sixth qualifier

Seventh qualifier

Eighth qualifier

References
 Main Draw
 Qualifying Draw

Aegon Classic - Singles
Singles